Ole Kristian Selnæs (born 7 July 1994) is a Norwegian professional footballer who plays for Swiss club Zürich as a defensive midfielder. Between 2015 and 2019, he made 32 appearances for the Norway national team scoring twice. He is the son of former Rosenborg goalkeeper Ivar Selnæs.

Club career

Early career
Selnæs was born in Trondheim, but lived in Lillestrøm when his father Ivar Selnæs was head coach of Skjetten SK and he was playing in the youth department of the same club. His family later moved back to Trondheim, with Selnæs joining Sverresborg IF.

Rosenborg
When Selnæs joined Rosenborg in 2009, he was earmarked for his accurate left foot and good knowledge of the game, which allowed him to develop as a defensive midfielder.

In 2011, he was heavily involved in the Rosenborg under-19 side that won the national championship and gained third place in their NextGen Series group. Despite still being barely known from outside the club, he was being recognised internally with an integral part of the first team's 2012 pre-season. His impressive pre-season was rewarded when, on 25 March, he signed a professional contract.

He started the season as back-up to the midfield pair of Mohammed-Awal Issah and Markus Henriksen, but soon became first choice beside Henriksen. His professional debut came against Lillestrøm on 1 April 2012, when he came on as a late substitute for Issah. The next week, he made his first start at home to Sogndal.

After four league matches he was named the biggest talent in Scandinavia by the web-site scan-scout.com, which did not surprise Rosenborg's head coach Jan Jönsson: "He has developed very fast, but I'm not surprised."

Selnæs was a regular in Rosenborg's midfield during the first half of the 2012 season, but lost his place in the starting line-up due to an injury. After his recovery, Rosenborg had bought Tarik Elyounoussi, Cristian Gamboa and Jaime Alas and Selnæs' chances were limited. But he stated in an interview with NRK in September 2012 that "I am only 19 years old and have plenty of time, and will work hard to get more chances for the first-team".

Saint Etienne
Selnæs joined AS Saint-Étienne on 31 January 2016.

Shenzhen
On 9 February 2019, Selnæs transferred to Super League newcomer Shenzhen.

Zürich
On 24 June 2022, Selnæs signed a one-year deal with Zürich in Switzerland.
His first goal scored with his new team was an own goal in the match against Glimt in UEFA Europa League the 15 september 2022.

International career
Selnæs represented his country from under-16 to under-21 youth level.

As of February 2021, he made 32 appearances for the senior national team.

Personal life
Selnæs is a huge fan of Hotel Cæsar, and in an interview with Adresseavisen in March 2012 he stated that he would love to play a role in the Norwegian soap opera. Two months later he was offered a small speaking role in the TV series.

Career statistics

Club

International

Scores and results list Norway's goal tally first, score column indicates score after each Selnæs goal.

Honours

Individual
Eliteserien Player of the Year: 2015
Eliteserien Midfielder of the Year: 2015

References

External links
 
 

1994 births
Living people
Footballers from Trondheim
Association football midfielders
Norwegian footballers
Norway international footballers
Norway under-21 international footballers
Norway youth international footballers
Rosenborg BK players
AS Saint-Étienne players
Shenzhen F.C. players
Hebei F.C. players
FC Zürich players
Eliteserien players
Ligue 1 players
Chinese Super League players
Norwegian expatriate footballers
Norwegian expatriate sportspeople in France
Expatriate footballers in France
Norwegian expatriate sportspeople in China
Expatriate footballers in China
Norwegian expatriate sportspeople in Switzerland
Expatriate footballers in Switzerland